DS2 (abbreviation of Dirty Sprite 2) is the third studio album by American rapper Future. It was released on July 17, 2015, through A1 Recordings and Freebandz, and distributed by Epic Records. The album serves as the sequel to his breakout mixtape, Dirty Sprite (2011). It features production from Metro Boomin, Southside, and Zaytoven, among others. The album was supported by three singles: "Fuck Up Some Commas", "Where Ya At", and "Stick Talk".

DS2 received generally positive reviews from critics, and was ranked as one of the best albums of 2015 and the decade by several publications. The album debuted at number one on the US Billboard 200, and it earned 151,000 units in its first week. By January 2016, the album sold 344,000 in the United States. In July 2022, the album was certified triple platinum by the Recording Industry Association of America (RIAA).

Background
On July 10, 2015, Future posted the cover artwork, while announcing that his new album would be called DS2, and would be released on July 17, 2015. The track list of the album was released on July 15, 2015.

Album artwork
The basis for the album's cover art is a stock photo sold through Shutterstock with the title "Color drop in water, photographed in motion. Ink swirling in water. Cloud of silky ink in water isolated on white background. Colorful ink in water, ink drop". The image was created by Sanja Tošić, an artist based in Slovenia. Although she did not know who Future was until The Fader contacted her to ask about the album art, Tošić said that she would buy a copy of his album.

Promotion
The album's lead single, "Fuck Up Some Commas", was released on March 2, 2015, the music video for the song was released on March 27. It peaked at number 55 on the US Billboard Hot 100.

The album's second single, "Where Ya At" featuring Drake, was released on July 16, 2015, the song peaked at number 28 on the Billboard Hot 100.

"Stick Talk" was later sent to rhythmic contemporary radio as the album's third single on February 1, 2016, the song peaked at number 91 on the Billboard Hot 100.

Critical reception

DS2 was met with generally positive reviews. At Metacritic, which assigns a normalized rating out of 100 to reviews from professional publications, the album received an average score of 80, based on 22 reviews. Aggregator AnyDecentMusic? gave it 7.3 out of 10, based on their assessment of the critical consensus.

AllMusic wrote that with DS2 Future solidified himself as, "a strange and yet in command figure standing at the center of a slick, inventive swirl of music". Kris Ex of Billboard stated, "Produced by a handful of trusted Atlanta trap producers, DS2 is gothic, narcotic and full of overcast skies". Complex wrote of the album, "If you've followed Future's recent moves, DS2 is not unprecedented, but it greatly enhances the brooding ambiance of his recent work, a dive further into the abyss". Brian Josephs of Consequence stated, "DS2 is his strongest campaign yet, and it's the first time a new Future album has met all expectations". Calum Slingerland of Exclaim! wrote that "the majority of these beats hit to hurt, and though the emotional Future that listeners have come to know through past cuts "Throw Away" and "My Savages" has been dialed back, the honesty and vulnerability come through when it counts". Sheldon Pearce of HipHopDX stated, "Dirty Sprite 2 doesn't survey any new territory for the croaking crooner, but it magnifies the depth of his distress and channels it into an even richer multilayered sonic experience".

Chris Kelly of Fact said, "DS2 is a relentless, dud-free hour that adds in most of his recent highlights to complete the story of his last year". Reviewing the album's deluxe edition for Vice, Robert Christgau deemed DS2 a "miserable minor masterpiece" that is "all the proof we needed that money can't buy happiness". Brian Duricy of PopMatters said, "Self-mythologizing aside, the music on DS2 is worthy of the praise lauded on Future". Meaghan Garvey of Pitchfork stated, "Future was always straightforward, never ashamed to confess his depression or infatuation, but the narratives never felt so focused, nuanced, or vulnerable than here". Christopher R. Weingarten of Rolling Stone stated, "It has little of the far-reaching ambition of Honest, but what it lacks in bold stroke, it more than makes up for in consistency". Drew Millard of Spin stated, "Dirty Sprite 2 is a tremendous compendium of everything you want from a Future album in 2015". Vish Khanna of Now said, "In lieu of artistry or any semblance of lyrical spark, DST offers monotonous production and relentless chanting".

Rankings

Commercial performance
DS2 debuted at number one on the US Billboard 200 with 151,000 album-equivalent units; it sold 126,000 copies in its first week. By January 2016, the album sold 344,000 copies domestically. On July 27, 2022, the album was certified triple platinum by the Recording Industry Association of America (RIAA) for combined sales, streaming and track-sale equivalents of three million units.

Track listing

Personnel
Credits adapted from the album's liner notes and Tidal.

 Glenn Schick – mastering engineer
 Eric Manco – mixing engineer (all tracks), recording engineer (3–5, 7, 9, 13, 15), engineer (17)
 Seth Firkins – mixing engineer (all tracks), recording engineer (1, 2, 6, 8, 10–12, 14, 16–18), engineer (7)

 Jeremy D. Brown – mixing engineer (15), assistant engineer (all tracks), miscellaneous producer (all tracks)
 Niles Roberts – assistant engineer
 Tyler Kumpee – assistant engineer

Charts

Weekly charts

Year-end charts

Decade-end charts

Certifications

References

2015 albums
Future (rapper) albums
Sequel albums
Albums produced by Zaytoven
Albums produced by Frank Dukes
Albums produced by Southside (record producer)
Albums produced by Metro Boomin
Albums produced by Allen Ritter
Albums produced by Sonny Digital